Sherburne Friend Cook (1896-1974) was an American physiologist and demographist, who served as professor and chairman of the department of physiology at the University of California, Berkeley. He was notable as a pioneer in population studies of the native peoples of North America and Mesoamerica and in field methods and quantitative analysis in archaeology.

Born and raised in Massachusetts, Cook earned his B.S. degree at Harvard University in 1919. During World War I, he served in France. He returned to Harvard for graduate studies, earning his M.A. in 1923, and completing his Ph.D. thesis, The Toxicity of the Heavy Metals in Relation to Respiration, in 1925. He taught physiology at University of California,  Berkeley from 1928 until his retirement in 1966, becoming a tenured professor and also serving as chairman of the department.

Cook repeatedly returned to the problems of estimating the pre-Columbian populations of California, Mexico, and other regions, and of tracing the rate and reasons for their subsequent decline. He often arrived at higher figures for pre-contact populations than had previous scholars, and his work has not escaped criticism within this controversial field (e.g., W. Michael Mathes 2005).

Selected publications
 "The Extent and Significance of Disease among the Indians of Baja California". 1935. Ibero-Americana No. 12. University of California, Berkeley.
 "The Population of Central Mexico in the Sixteenth Century"'. 1948. Ibero-Americana No. 31. University of California, Berkeley.
 (with Woodrow Borah) Essays in Population History. 1971–1979. 3 vols. University of California Press, Berkeley.
 The Conflict between the California Indians and White Civilization. 1976. University of California Press, Berkeley. (Reprinting six studies originally published in Ibero-Americana, 1940–1943)
 The Population of the California Indians, 1769-1970. 1976. University of California Press, Berkeley.

Honors
 Guggenheim Fellowships awarded in 1938

References

 Brooks, Sheilagh T. 1976. "Tribute to Sherburne Friend , 1896-1974". Journal of California Anthropology 3:3-12.
 Mathes, W. Michael. 2005. "Reflections and Considerations Regarding Baja California Demography Before and During the Mission Period". In Archaeology without Limits: Papers in Honor of Clement W. Meighan, edited by Brian D. Dillon and Matthew A. Boxt, pp. 205–212. Labyrinthos, Lancaster, California.

External links
 
 
  "Tribute to Sherburne Friend , 1896-1974"; includes "Anthropological Bibliography of Sherburne Friend Cook" excerpted from a more extensive bibliography in the original publication.

Historians of Native Americans
American ethnologists
20th-century American historians
20th-century American male writers
Historians of Mexico
Harvard University alumni
University of California, Berkeley College of Letters and Science faculty
1896 births
1974 deaths
American male non-fiction writers
Historians from California